Hen's Teeth and Horse's Toes (1983) is Stephen Jay Gould's third volume of collected essays reprinted from his monthly columns for Natural History magazine titled "This view of life". Three essays appeared elsewhere. "Evolution as Fact and Theory" first appeared in Discover magazine in May 1981; "Phyletic size decrease in Hershey bars" appeared in C. J. Rubins's Junk Food, 1980; and his "Reply to critics", was written specifically for this volume as a commentary upon criticism of essay 16, "The Piltdown Conspiracy".

Reviews
 Steven Rose, "And Zebra Stripes and Chocolate Bars", The New York Times, 8 May 1983, section 7, page 3.
 Richard Dawkins, "The Art of the Developable. Review of Pluto's Republic by Peter Medawar and Hen's Teeth and Horse's Toes by Stephen Jay Gould", reprinted in The Devil's Chaplain: Selected Essays, Phoenix, 2003.

Awards
The book was awarded the 1983 Phi Beta Kappa Award for Science from the Phi Beta Kappa Society.

External links
W. W. Norton promotional page

1983 non-fiction books
American essay collections
Books by Stephen Jay Gould
English-language books
Natural history books
Works originally published in Natural History (magazine)
W. W. Norton & Company books